Eddie Ocampo is a drummer of the Third Wave Ska movement. He performed in several bands, such as The Insteps, Stubborn All-Stars, Dave Hillyard Rocksteady 7, the Jammyland All Stars, the Fandanglers, and many more Ska and Version City related bands. Ocampo has also designed album art for artists such as The Slackers.

He lives in Windsor Terrace, Brooklyn, NY, and plays in The Full Watts Band.

References

Living people
Date of birth missing (living people)
American drummers
People from Prospect Heights, Brooklyn
Musicians from Brooklyn
Year of birth missing (living people)